Tony Grove Lake is a lake in Cache County, Utah. The Tony Grove Lake Campground is located on the southeast shore of the lake. The lake and campground are situated on the Logan Canyon Scenic Byway.

A historic marker at the lake states that Tony Grove's name derived from its popularity with wealthy residents of Logan in the late 19th and early 20th centuries.

This region embraces some of the most rugged and spectacular country in the Bear River Range. The area around this glacial lake explodes into wildflowers in the early summer.

Many trails throughout the area offer wildlife viewing. Access and parking for the White Pine Lake Trail, Coldwater Spring Trail, Naomi Peak Trail and High Creek Trail is located at the Tony Grove Lake parking lot.

References

Gallery

External links

 Utah Scenic Byways by Utah office of Tourism
 Tony Grove Lake Area, Utah by U.S. Department of Transportation National Scenic Byways Program
 Tony Grove Lake Campground

Bear River (Great Salt Lake)
Lakes of Cache County, Utah
Lakes of Utah
Tourist attractions in Cache County, Utah